Roger Eugene Robert Tauvel (8 November 1902 – 4 August 1976) was a French sports shooter. He competed in the 50 m pistol event at the 1952 Summer Olympics.

References

1902 births
1976 deaths
French male sport shooters
Olympic shooters of France
Shooters at the 1952 Summer Olympics